

List of Ambassadors

Ofra Farhi 2022-
Jacob Keidar (Non-Resident, Nairobi) 2007 - 2011
Itzhak Gerberg (Non-Resident, Jerusalem) 2002 - 2003
Gad Elron 1971 - 1973
Matityahu Dagan 1968 - 1971
Tehan Ben-Zion 1965 - 1968

References

Zambia
Israel